The Nashville and Eastern Railroad  is a shortline railroad which administers  of track between Nashville and Monterey, Tennessee, of which  are currently operational. The company is based in Lebanon, Tennessee.

The Nashville and Eastern was formed in the 1980s to reestablish freight service from Nashville to Lebanon and points east. The railroad currently extends to Monterey, where it serves a large sand mining operation. The railroad provides freight shipping services to more than 30 companies. It also runs occasional passenger excursion trains from Nashville to Cookeville or Watertown in cooperation with the Tennessee Central Railway Museum in Nashville. The tracks that it operates were originally operated by the Tennessee Central Railway, which went out of business in 1968.

The railroad is the home of the Music City Star commuter rail service between Nashville and Lebanon. Service began on September 18, 2006. The service is operated by the Regional Transportation Authority, Nashville's public transportation agency.

NERR has a subsidiary, the Nashville & Western Railroad Corp. ,  that operates between Nashville and Ashland City on the former western end of the Tennessee Central.  

On November 5, 2018, R.J. Corman Railroad Group announced that it had finalized an agreement to acquire both NERR and NWR as well as Transit Solution Group, operator of the Music City Star commuter trains. Pending regulatory approval, R. J. Corman was expected to take over operations in January 2019.

References

Tennessee railroads
Transportation in Nashville, Tennessee
Lebanon, Tennessee
Spin-offs of the Louisville and Nashville Railroad